Centennial is an unincorporated community in Calumet Township, Houghton County, Michigan, United States.

References

Unincorporated communities in Houghton County, Michigan
Unincorporated communities in Michigan
Houghton micropolitan area, Michigan